Thomas Newton (c. 1542–1607) was an English clergyman, poet, author and translator.

Life

The eldest son of Edward Newton of Park House, in Butley, a part of the parish of Prestbury, Cheshire, he was educated first at the Macclesfield grammar school by John Brownsword, a much-praised schoolmaster. Newton went on to Trinity College, Oxford, which he left in 1562 to study at Queens' College, Cambridge, but then returned to his original college.

In 1569 or 1570, he published The Worthye Booke of Old Age. The book's preface was dated "frome Butleye the seuenth of March 1569", and many of his other books before 1583 were dated from the same place. He wrote books on historical, medical and theological subjects, and contributed many commendatory verses in English and Latin to various works, a common practice of the time. For many of his verses and books he styles himself "Thomas Newtonus Cestreshyrius", showing an evident affection for his county of birth.

He may have practiced as a physician in Butley and taught at Macclesfield school. In 1583 he was appointed rector of Little Ilford, Essex, from where most of his later works are dated. His most significant publications were a series of translations of Cicero and of Seneca's tragedies. Atropoion Delion; or, The Death of Delia, a pastoral elegy on the death of Queen Elizabeth in 1603 may have been by this Thomas Newton.

According to The Dictionary of National Biography:

"Newton was a skilled writer of Latin verse, in which, Ritson states, he excited the admiration of his contemporaries; while Warton describes him as the elegant Latin encomiast and the first Englishman who wrote Latin elegiacs with classical clearness and terseness. He also wrote English verses with ease and fluency, and translated several works from the Latin. All his books are now very scarce; most of them have very long titles."

Newton was married and the father of two sons, Emanuel (who seems to have died before his father) and Abel. After his death in 1607 (sometime between 27 April, when his will was dated, and 13 June, when it was proved at Canterbury), he was probably buried at Little Ilford.

Bibliography
Each year links to its corresponding "[year] in literature" or "[year] in poetry" article (spelling and capitalisation as in the source material):
 1568: An epitaphe vpon the [...] Lady Knowles (attributed to Newton, but "doubtful if by him", according to the Dictionary of National Biography) 
 1569 (attribution less certain): The Booke of Marcus Tullius Cicero, entituled Paradoxia Stoicorum [...]; the dedication, signed "Thomas Newton" is dated "from Greenwich the kalendes of June 1569"
 1569: The Worthye Booke of Old Age, translated from Cicero
 1574: A Direction for the Health of Magistrates and Studentes, translated from Latin, dedicated to Sir Francis Walsingham
 1575: A Notable Historie of the Saracens, translation from the Italian of Agostino Curione.
 1576: The Touchstone of Complexions, translated from Latin; second edition 1581; third edition 1633
 1577: Foure Seuerall Treatises of M. Tullius Cicero
 1577: Vocabula Magistri Stanbrigii; second edition 1596, third edition 1615, fourth edition 1636, fifth edition 1649
 1580: Approved Medicines and Cordiall Receiptes ("Receiptes": Recipes)
 1580 (attribution less certain): A Pleasaunt Dialogue concerning Phisicke and Phisitions [...] translated out of the Castlin tongue by T. N.
 Year uncertain, but possibly 1580: A View of Valyaunce
 1581: (Editor, and translator of one of the works, the Thebais) Seneca his tenne Tragedies translated into Englysh, a compilation of translations previously published separately by Studley, Nevile, Nuce and Jasper Heywood, here collected for the first time in one volume; dedicated to Sir Thomas Heneage, treasurer of the Queen's Chamber
 1581: A Commentarie or Exposition vpon the twoo Epistles Generall of Sainct Peter and that of Sainct Jude, translated from the Latin of Martin Luther
 1586: True and Christian Friendshippe, translated from Latin
 1586: The Olde Mans Dietarie
 1587: The True Tryall and Examination of a Mans own Selfe, translated
 1587: An Herbal for the Bible
 1589: Principum ac illustrium aliquot et eruditorum in Anglia virorum Ecomia and Illustrium aliquot Anglorum Encomia, contributions to Leland's De Rebus Britannicus Collectanea
 1590: Ioannis Brunseurdi  Maclesfeldensis Gymnasiarchae Progymnasmata quaedam Poetica
 1590: Thomas Newton's Staff to lean on

Verses published in other works
Newton's poetry in English and Latin appear in more than 20 works from 1578 to 1597, including these:
 1576: Blandie's translation of Osorius's Discourse of Ciuill and Christian Nobilitie
 1577: Batman's Golden Booke of the Leaden Goddes
 1578: Hunnis's Hive of Hunnye
 1578: Lyte's translation of Dodoens' A nievve herball, or, Historie of plantes
 1579: Munday's Mirror of Mutabilitie
 1579: Bullein's Bulwarke of Defence
 1587: Mirror for Magistrates
 1587: a metrical epilogue to Heywood's Workes
 1589: Ives's Instructions for the Warres
 1591: Ripley's Compound of Alchymy
 1595: Tymme's Briefe Description of Hierus lem

Notes

Attribution

1542 births
1607 deaths
16th-century English medical doctors
17th-century English medical doctors
17th-century English poets
17th-century male writers
16th-century English poets
English translators
16th-century translators
17th-century translators
Year of birth uncertain
People of the Elizabethan era
People from Cheshire
Alumni of Queens' College, Cambridge
English male poets